Michael Chinouya (born 9 June 1986) is a Zimbabwean cricketer. He made his One Day International debut for Zimbabwe against India in July 2013. In July 2016 he was added to Zimbabwe's Test squad for their series against New Zealand. On 28 July 2016 he made his Test debut for Zimbabwe against New Zealand.

References

External links
 

1986 births
Living people
Zimbabwean cricketers
Zimbabwe Test cricketers
Zimbabwe One Day International cricketers
Sportspeople from Kwekwe
Mid West Rhinos cricketers